Nantong railway station is a railway station in Chongchuan District, Nantong, Jiangsu, China. It is an intermediate station on the Nanjing–Qidong railway and is also connected to the Shanghai–Nantong railway and the Yancheng–Nantong high-speed railway via a junction.

History
The station opened in July 2004. In 2006, the station was demolished and rebuilt.

See also
Nantong West railway station

References 

Railway stations in Jiangsu
Railway stations in China opened in 2004